Viðarsdóttir is an Icelandic patronymic surname, literally meaning "daughter of Viðar". Notable people with the name include:

Margrét Lára Viðarsdóttir (born 1986), Icelandic footballer
Ólína Guðbjörg Viðarsdóttir (born 1981), Icelandic footballer

Icelandic-language surnames